Icelandic Cup is a name given to cup competitions in Iceland and may refer to:

Basketball
 Icelandic Men's Basketball Cup, the top tier men's basketball cup in Iceland
 Icelandic Women's Basketball Cup, the top tier women's basketball cup in Iceland

Football
 Icelandic Men's Football Cup, the top tier men's football cup in Iceland
 Icelandic Women's Football Cup, the top tier women's football cup in Iceland

Handball
 Icelandic Men's Handball Cup, the top tier men's handball cup in Iceland
 Icelandic Women's Handball Cup, the top tier women's handball cup in Iceland